Jordan "DJ Swivel" Young (born 14 December 1984) is a Grammy-Award winning  music producer, mixer, vocal engineer, songwriter, and plugin developer. His work with The Chainsmokers yielded 3 RIAA Diamond Certifications ("Closer", "Something Just Like This", "Don't Let Me Down"), making them tied for 4th all-time in the artists with the most single certifications, diamond. He came to prominence in 2011 working for Beyoncé as her vocal engineer on the album "4". He was awarded "Secret Genius: Dance" by Spotify in 2018.

Starting his career in New York City circa 2005 under Ken "Duro" Ifill, he has since worked with the likes of Rema, BTS, Beyoncé, Lil Nas X, The Chainsmokers, Dua Lipa, Coldplay, Rihanna, Jay-Z, Cordae, Gryffin, Fabolous, Rick Ross, Jay Sean, Britney Spears, Sean Combs, Wyclef Jean, Rita Ora, Mary J. Blige, Tiësto, and Whitney Houston.  

Starting in 2020, Jordan created a line of award-winning  music software products under the name DJ Swivel. He owns a music publishing company, Waves With Words, in partnership with Concord.  

Born in Toronto, Canada, DJ Swivel resides in Los Angeles.

Selected Discography (Mixing, Production, Engineer, Writer)

Personal life
His mother is Christine Bentley, former news anchor for the Toronto TV station CFTO.

Career 
In 2013, he won a Grammy award for Best Traditional R&B Performance for "Love on Top" by Beyoncé.

In 2015, he co-founded music tech startup SKIO Music.

In 2016, he was inducted to the Full Sail University Hall of Fame class of 2015.

Swivel won a Grammy Award in 2017 for Best Dance Recording for mixing "Don't Let Me Down" by The Chainsmokers.

In January 2020, Young released a music software plugin called The Sauce, which is an affects processor for vocals. In 2020, he also released another plugin called Spread, which mainly converting mono tracks to stereo.

Extended Discography (Mixing, Engineer, Assistant)

References

1984 births
Living people
Canadian record producers
Grammy Award winners
Hip hop record producers
Canadian audio engineers
Canadian DJs
Place of birth missing (living people)